China's population consists of 56 ethnic groups, not including some ethnic groups from Taiwan. 

The Han people are the largest ethnic group in mainland China. In 2010, 91.51% of the population were classified as Han (~1.2 billion). Besides the Han Chinese majority, 55 other ethnic (minority) groups are categorized in present China, numbering approximately 105 million people (8%), mostly concentrated in the bordering northwest, north, northeast, south and southwest but with some in central interior areas.

The major minority ethnic groups in China are Zhuang (16.9 million), Hui (10.5 million), Manchu (10.3 million), Uyghur (10 million), Miao (9.4 million), Yi (8.7 million), Tujia (8.3 million), Tibetan (6.2 million), Mongolian (5.9 million), Dong (2.8 million), Buyei (2.8 million), Yao (2.7 million), Bai (1.9 million), Korean (1.8 million), Hani (1.6 million), Li (1.4 million), Kazakh (1.4 million) and Dai (1.2 million). At least 126,000 people from Canada, the US and Europe are living in Mainland China. In addition, there are also unrecognized ethnic groups, for example: Chuanqing people (穿青人), and others, who comprise over 730,000 people.

Ethnic groups recognized by the People's Republic of China 

The following are the 56 ethnic groups (listed by population) officially recognized by the People's Republic of China (39 in 1954; 54 by 1964; with the most recent addition the Jino people in 1979).

AGB 3304－91 "Names of ethnicities of China in romanization with codes";
BThe population only includes mainland China;
CFor ethnic groups officially recognised in 1964 or earlier, this is the year of first inclusion in the national census, which were in 1954 and 1964;
1Also included are the Chuanqing;
2Also includes Utsuls of Hainan, descended from Cham refugees;
3One subset of which is also known as Hmong and other include Hmu, Xong and A-Hmao. Some of the related languages and groups of peoples are not necessarily classified under the Miao umbrella, which makes this term somewhat vague.
4including Amdowa and Khampa, as well as roughly half of Pumi speakers, the remainder of whom are classified as a separate Pumi ethnicity;
5Also known as Kam;
6Also included are the Sangkong;
7This category includes several different Tai-speaking groups historically referred to as Bai-yi [in fact, the Dai nationalities are speakers of Shan languages varieties -for example : Tai Lue and Tai Nuea peoples are actually Shan peoples subgroups]. Although that, the speakers of Bumang are also included in this Dai nationality. ;
8Also included are the Mosuo;
9Also included are the Qago;
10Known as Kachin in Myanmar;
11Also included are the Then;
12They are not Tajik people but Pamiri people;
13The same group as Vietnamese or Kinh people in Sino-Vietnamese;
14Known as Palaung in Myanmar;
15The same group as Nanai on the Russian side of the border;
16A collective name for all Taiwanese aborigine groups in Taiwan. In fact, the numbers of Gaoshan in census covers only those who lives in Mainland China (mainly in Fujian) and consists of Amis (autonym: Pangcah), Paiwan and Bunun peoples

Taiwanese aborigines 

The People's Republic of China government officially refers to all Taiwanese Aborigines, as Gaoshan, whereas the Republic of China (Taiwan) recognizes 16 groups of Taiwanese aborigines. The term Gaoshan has a different connotation in Taiwan than it does in mainland China.

"Unrecognized" ethnic minority groups 

This is a list of ethnic groups in China that are not officially recognized by the government of the People's Republic of China.

 Äynu (艾努人 Àinǔrén)
 Altaians (Oirots) are classified as Mongols
 Fuyu Kyrgyz are classified as Kyrgyz
 Gejia (家人 Gèjiārén)
 Bajia (八甲人 Bājiǎrén)
 Deng (僜人 Dèngrén)
 Hu (户人 Hùrén)
 Khmu (克木人 Kèmùrén)
 Kucong (Yellow Lahu / Lahu Shi; 苦聪人 / 苦聰人 Kǔcōngrén)
 Mang (芒人 Mángrén)
 Ili Turks (土尔克人 / 土爾克人)
 Sherpas (夏尔巴人 / 夏爾巴人 Xià'ěrbārén)
 Tankas (疍家人 / 蜑家人 Dànjiārén) including Fuzhou Tanka
 Tebbu (迭部人 Diébùrén)
 Tuvans (图瓦人 Túwǎrén) are considered part of the Mongol ethnicity
 Waxiang (瓦乡人 Wǎxiāng rén)
 Jews (犹太人 / 猶太人 Yóutàirén) (Jewish people of China and Jews in general)
 Macanese (土生葡人 Tǔshēng púrén), mixed race Catholic Portuguese speakers who lived in Macau since 16th century of various ethnic origins
 Utsuls (回辉人 Huíhuīrén), descendants of Cham Muslims who fled Vietnamese invasions of Champa

During the Fifth National Population Census of the People's Republic of China (2000), 734,438 persons in the Chinese mainland, 97% of them in Guizhou, were specifically recorded as belonging to "Undistinguished ethnic groups". Presumably, other members of such groups may have been counted within larger "recognized" groups.

Ethnic groups in Hong Kong and Macau 

Hong Kong and Macau are special administrative regions of the People's Republic of China. The governments of Hong Kong and Macau do not use the official PRC ethnic classification system, nor does the PRC's official classification system take ethnic groups in Hong Kong and Macau into account. Minority groups such as Europeans (mainly English and Portuguese), and South or Southeast Asians (mainly Filipinos, Indians, Indonesians, Nepalese, and Pakistanis) live in Hong Kong.

Gallery

See also 

 Affirmative action in China
 Demographics of China
 Demographics of Taiwan
 Taiwanese people
 Ethnic minorities in China
 Han Chinese subgroups
 Hua–Yi distinction
 Languages of China
 List of endangered languages in China
 Kra–Dai ethnic groups in China
 Taiwanese indigenous peoples
 Unrecognized ethnic groups in China
 Zhonghua minzu

References

Further reading

External links 

 "Chinese ethnic odyssey" - collection of articles from the People's Daily
 Family album of Chinese 56 ethnic groups
 nytimes.com
 Map share of ethnic by county of China
 Map share of dominate ethnic by county of China

Ethnic
China